Chandraswami (born Nemichand Jain; 29 October 1949 – 23 May 2017) was a controversial Indian Tantrik (practitioner of Tantra).

His father Dharamchand Gandhi Jain came from Behror in Rajasthan and worked as a money lender.  He moved to Hyderabad when Chandraswami was a child.  Chandraswami was attracted to the study of Tantra from an early age.  He left home when still young to become a student of Upadhyay Amar Muni and the scholar of Tantra, Mahamohopadhyay Gopinath Kaviraj.  He later lived in the jungles of Bihar where he spent time in meditation.  He claimed that after four years he obtained extraordinary powers called siddhis.  Though Chandraswami was by birth a Jain, he became a "sadhaka" (worshipper) of the Goddess Kali. He was also interested in interfaith dialogue, and sat on the Board of World Religious Leaders for the Elijah Interfaith Institute.

Rise to fame 
He first gained fame through his skill as an astrologer but his rise to national prominence came as a result of his association with Prime Minister P. V. Narasimha Rao, Chandra Shekhar and V. P. Singh.  Chandraswami was said to have been their spiritual adviser.  Soon after Rao became Prime Minister in 1991, Chandraswami built an ashram known as Vishwa Dharmayatan Sansathan in Delhi's Qutub Institutional Area.  The land for the ashram had been allotted by Indira Gandhi.  
Chandraswami is said to have dispensed spiritual advice to the Sultan of Brunei, Sheikh Isa bin Salman Al Khalifa of Bahrain, actress Elizabeth Taylor, British PM Margaret Thatcher, arms dealer Adnan Khashoggi, crime lord Dawood Ibrahim, and Tiny Rowland, Yasser Arafat. His loyal supporters include his secretary Vikram Singh,Assistant Vijayraj Chauhan and the late Kailash Nath Aggarwal, known as Mamaji.  Chandraswami's finances have fluctuated with his political fortune.

Legal challenges
Chandraswami has been accused repeatedly of financial irregularity activities.  In 1996 he was arrested on charges of defrauding a London-based businessman of $100,000.  He has faced charges for repeated violation of the Foreign Exchange Regulation Act.  An income-tax raid on his ashram is reported to have uncovered original drafts of payments to Adnan Khashoggi of $11 million.  In its report, the Jain Commission dedicated a volume to his alleged involvement in the assassination of Rajiv Gandhi.  Seventeen years after the assassination of Rajiv Gandhi, the Enforcement Directorate was still investigating his alleged role as financier of the killing.  
In May 2009, the Supreme Court granted Chandraswami permission to travel abroad, lifting a ban on overseas travel imposed as a result of his alleged involvement in the assassination of Rajiv Gandhi. In  June 2011, the Supreme Court fined Chandraswami, for violating the Foreign Exchange Regulation Act, a sum of ₹9 crores.

Death
Chandra Swami died of multiple organ failure at Apollo Hospital in New Delhi on 23 May 2017.

References

Tantra
1948 births
2017 deaths
Deaths from multiple organ failure